This list of physics awards is an index to articles about notable awards for physics.
The list includes lists of awards by the American Physical Society of the United States, and of the Institute of Physics of the United Kingdom, followed by a list organized by region and country of the organization that gives the award. Awards are not necessarily restricted to people from the country of the award giver.

American Physical Society

The American Physical Society of the United States sponsors a number of awards for outstanding contributions to physics.

Institute of Physics

International

Americas

Asia

Europe

Oceania

See also

 Lists of awards
 Lists of science and technology awards

References

 
physics